Wang Ji-won (born November 12, 1988) is a South Korean actress and ballet dancer.

Career
Wang trained with the Royal Ballet School in England and studied Dance at the Korea National University of Arts, she was a member of the Korea National Ballet in 2009. Wang began acting in 2012 and has appeared in television dramas, notably I Need Romance 3 and You Are My Destiny.

In December 2018, Wang signed with YG Entertainment. She decided not to renew and has signed a contract with SH Media Corp.

Personal life 
On January 20, 2022 it was confirmed that Wang is preparing for marriage with Park Jong-suk, a South Korean ballerino. They got married in Seoul on February 6, 2022.

Filmography

Television series

Films

Variety Shows

Awards and nominations

References

External links
Wang Ji-won at YG Entertainment 

South Korean television actresses
1988 births
Living people
People educated at the Royal Ballet School
South Korean film actresses
YG Entertainment artists